The Elias Sports Bureau is a privately-held company providing historical and current statistical information for the major professional sports leagues operating in the United States and Canada.

Elias is the official statistician for Major League Baseball (MLB), the National Basketball Association (NBA), and the National Football League (NFL). Other prominent clients include Major League Soccer (MLS), the WNBA, the NBA G League, and the PGA.

Elias’s products and services are utilized by league offices and teams for official scoring, data validation, and promotional purposes, as well as by broadcast partners including ESPN, the NFL Network, the MLB Network, and others to provide announcers and producers with pre-, post-, and in-game notes, player statistics, and historical context to make live sports broadcasts more compelling and informative.

Recent company initiatives include the launch of the Elias Game Plan App through Elias Digital Solutions, LLC, a wholly-owned subsidiary of Elias. Elias Game Plan brings data and insights once reserved for broadcast networks directly to fans.

The Elias Sports Bureau is headquartered in New York City.

Elias Sports Bureau, Inc.
1430 Broadway, Suite 7E
New York City, NY 10018
(212) 869-1530

History
In 1913 Al Munro Elias and his brother Walter founded the Al Munro Elias Baseball Bureau, Inc. in New York City. The Bureau's methods of collection and presentation of statistics set the form and precedent for recording baseball information, and has influenced the universal collection and presentation of other sports’ leagues information ever since.

At first, the Munro brothers sold printed scorecards with baseball data directly to fans. The Bureau's popularity surged in 1916, when The New York Telegram daily newspaper began publishing the Bureau's weekly compilation of batting and pitching averages and league leaders.

In 1916, Elias was named the official statistician of the National League and International League (the minor league baseball circuit), with the American League and other minor leagues following shortly thereafter.

In 1937, the Bureau took over the publication of Charley White's Record Book, also known as the “Little Red Book”, shortly after White’s passing. The Little Red Book was an official source for major league records and statistics used by sportswriters, club and league officials, players, and sports fans.

Upon Al’s passing in 1938, Walter Elias became President of the Al Munro Elias Baseball Bureau and began publishing The Pocket Cyclopedia of Major League Baseball, the successor to the Little Red Book. Lester Goodman assumed control of the Al Munro Elias Baseball Bureau after the death of Walter Elias in 1949. Goodman managed the business on behalf of the Elias brothers’ widows until his passing in 1952.

That same year, Seymour Siwoff, who had joined the company in 1937 as an intern while studying at St. John's University, purchased the Al Munro Elias Baseball Bureau from the Elias's widows. Siwoff renamed the company the Elias Sports Bureau to better fulfill his vision of incorporating all professional sports, and served as company president for 67 years. During Siwoff’s tenure, the company grew into the world’s most trusted source for sports data. Elias became the official statisticians of the NFL in 1961, the NBA in 1970, the MLS in 1993, and the WNBA and the NHL in 1997 (the National Hockey League now complies its official statistics internally), as well as the leading sports statistics source for newspapers, magazines, websites, and sports broadcasters across the country.

Seymour was inducted into the New York Sports Hall of Fame in 1992 for Elias’s contribution to the growth in popularity of sports through statistics and recordkeeping. Posthumously, Siwoff was named a finalist for the Pro Football Hall of Fame as a contributor in 2020, and was named a semi-finalist in 2022.

Today
Today, Elias Sports Bureau is home to the world’s foremost team of sports statisticians and historians, and currently employs more than a dozen full-time researchers and writers who document games daily.

Elias maintains a “family owned” spirit, and remains a private company. After stepping down in 2019, Siwoff turned the company over to his grandson, Joe Gilston, who continues to serve as President. Gilston’s mission is to maintain the core company values of inclusion, accuracy, and accountability, while driving Elias’s modernization efforts.

Elias researchers average over 20 years’ experience, with several senior writers being members of the Baseball Writers' Association of America who cast official votes for the Major League Baseball Hall of Fame candidates every year.

Elias' customized game notes, historical notes, and statistics are used during live game broadcasts and pre- and post-game coverage, on sports commentary shows, nightly news sportscasts, as well as for draft coverage. Official Elias data services are also used by sports books and casinos to help create odds and spreads and verify the results of every contest.

Elias has digitized the records and box scores of games going as far back as 1876 for Major League Baseball and has recently launched the Elias Game Plan App to reach fantasy players and sports bettors.

Products and services
Elias receives daily game results directly from league offices. Elias scrubs the data, resolves any scoring issues, and archives the certified data for instant access. Official league data is then used to provide the following services:

 Official League Statisticians Elias researchers help league offices validate complex data, clarify complex scoring decisions, and ensure the accuracy and integrity of rules, statistics, and records based on precedent.
 Live Statistical Research Working in shifts around the clock, Elias researchers may be contacted instantly to provide context or confirmation of events on the field in real time to producers and broadcasters.
 Elias Editorial Notes Elias researchers provide comprehensive game and player notes based on official league statistics to broadcast partners for announcers and analysts to reference before, during, and after games.
 Elias Data Services are used by league offices, broadcast networks, and sports entertainment organizations, daily customized data streams on upcoming opponents and players of interest reveal trends, insights, and milestones based on historical performance.
 AccessElias This online service allows subscribing sports journalists and researchers to access official league statistics, study the Elias database, create search criteria, and analyze results.
 Elias Game Plan App Delivers game insights, official player and team stats, and other sports betting information usually reserved to broadcasters directly to users’ smartphones and networked devices.

See also
 Stats Perform
 Sportradar US

References

External links
 Elias Sports Bureau Official website
 Elias Game Plan App
 Elias Digital Solutions website
 Statmuse

Statistical service organizations
1913 establishments in New York (state)
Companies based in New York City